Mạc Hiến Tông (?–1546), birth name Mạc Phúc Hải, was the third emperor of the Mạc dynasty of Annam from  1540 to 1546. He was born in Cao Đôi village, Bình Hà district (present day Nam Tan, Nam Sach, Hai Duong). He was the oldest son of emperor Mac Thai Tong and grandson of Mac Dang Dung.

Sources 

 Đại Việt Thông Sử, Lê Quý Đôn (1759)

1546 deaths
Mạc dynasty emperors
Year of birth unknown
Vietnamese monarchs